Below is a list of current Australian Swimming Championship records as ratified by Swimming Australia. The Australian Swimming Championships are held annually to determine to the Australian champion in each event.

All records were set in finals unless noted otherwise.

Long Course (50 m)

Men

Women

Short Course (25 m)

Men

Women

References

Australian championships
Records
Records